The Ministry of Foreign Affairs of the People's Republic of China is the first-ranked executive department of the State Council of the People's Republic of China, responsible for the country's foreign relations. It is led by the Foreign Minister, currently Qin Gang, who serves as the nation's principal representative abroad. The ministry is headquartered in Chaoyang District, Beijing, the country's primary diplomatic quarter.

The MFA's primary functions include formulating foreign policy, administering the nation's diplomatic missions, representing Chinese interests at the United Nations, negotiating foreign treaties and agreements, and advising the State Council on foreign affairs. The Ministry is subordinate to the Central Foreign Affairs Commission, which decides on policy-making and led by General Secretary of the Chinese Communist Party. Foreign policies concerning the Republic of China fall under the jurisdiction of the Taiwan Affairs Office. As of 2019, the ministry maintains the largest diplomatic network in the world, with 276 embassies and consulates.

History 

In October 2022, it was reported that the MFA asked consular missions in Hong Kong about their floor plans, lease details, and staff residences, and also asked to inspect new premises before staff enter them.

Organization 
The Ministry consists of 29 individual offices, including departments responsible for specific regions, policy areas, as well as administration of the Ministry itself. Each office is headed by a director-general with at least two deputy directors-general. The offices are:

 The General Office (办公厅): Circulates communications within the Ministry, manages information technology systems, and coordinates with foreign parties in response to crises.
 The Department of Policy Planning (政策规划司): Responsible for research, analysis, and policy formulation related to international affairs. Writes speeches and other major foreign policy documents. Conducts work relevant to Chinese diplomatic history.
 The Department of Asian Affairs (亚洲司)
 The Department of West Asian and North African Affairs (西亚北非司)
 The Department of African Affairs (非洲司)
 The Department of European-Central Asian Affairs (欧亚司)
 The Department of European Affairs (欧洲司)
 The Department of North American and Oceanian Affairs (北美大洋洲司)
 The Department of Latin American Affairs (拉丁美洲司)
 The Department of International Organizations and Conferences (国际司)
 The Department of International Economic Affairs (国际经济司)
 The Department of Arms Control (军控司)
 The Department of Boundary and Ocean Affairs (边界与海洋事务司)
 The Department of Treaty and Law (条约法律司)
 The Information Department (新闻司): Manages press relations and public presentation of Chinese foreign policy. Headed by spokeswoman Hua Chunying.
 The Protocol Department (礼宾司): Handles matters related to protocol in diplomatic events and ceremonies.
 The Department of Consular Affairs (领事司)
 The Department of Hong Kong, Macao and Taiwan Affairs (港澳台司)
 The Department of Translation and Interpretation (翻译司): Manages and provides training for interpretation and translation work in English, Spanish, French, and Portuguese at international events and for state diplomatic events and documents. Regional departments are responsible for general translation and interpretation work within their respective regions.
 The Department of Foreign Affairs Management (外事管理司): Drafts and oversees regulations related to foreign affairs for sub-national entities such as local governments, state-owned enterprises, and other bodies of the State Council of China.
 The Department of External Security Affairs (涉外安全事务司)
 The Department of Personnel (干部司)
 The Bureau for Retired Personnel (离退休干部局)
 The Administrative Department (行政司): Oversees planning, construction, real estate, valuable assets (antiques and artifacts), housing, infrastructure, and overall management in overseas missions. 
 The Department of Finance (财务司)
 The Bureau of Archives (档案馆)
 Office of Leading Group for Conducting Inspections in the Foreign Ministry (外交部巡视工作领导小组办公室): Overseas disciplinary investigations and policy in accordance with Chinese Communist Party regulations.
 The Bureau for Chinese Diplomatic Missions Abroad (国外工作局)
 The Department of Services for Foreign Ministry Home and Overseas Offices (服务局): Oversees logistics for diplomatic missions abroad.

See also 

 Ambassadors of China
 Ministries of the People's Republic of China
 Foreign Minister of the People's Republic of China
 List of Foreign Ministry Spokespersons of the People's Republic of China
 China Foreign Affairs University
 Office of the Commissioner of the Ministry of Foreign Affairs of the People's Republic of China in the Hong Kong Special Administrative Region
 Office of the Commissioner of the Ministry of Foreign Affairs of the People's Republic of China in the Macao Special Administrative Region

References

Citations

Sources

External links 
 

 
Foreign relations of China
Foreign Affairs
China
Chaoyang District, Beijing
People's Republic of China diplomacy